Regina Carrol (May 2, 1943 – November 4, 1992) was an American performer, born as Regina Carol Gelfan, mostly remembered for her roles in films directed by her husband, Al Adamson.

After several stage roles, she entered film through a family friend, Steve Cochran who gave her a small role as a beatnik in The Beat Generation (1959).  She met Al Adamson in a coffee shop in 1968 that led her to appear in several of his films.

She died of cancer in St. George, Utah, on November 4, 1992.

Singing roles
Dracula vs. Frankenstein (1971; "I Travel Light")
Black Heat (1976; "No More Mail 'til Tomorrow")

Filmography

References

Brain of Blood was featured on an installment of Cinematic Titanic in 2008 under the title The Oozing Skull.

External links

1943 births
1992 deaths
20th-century American actresses
American film actresses
Deaths from cancer in Utah
Actresses from Boston
20th-century American singers
20th-century American women singers